Bryant House may refer to:

William Cullen Bryant Homestead, Cummington, Massachusetts
Bryant–Cushing House, Norwell, Massachusetts
William Bryant Octagon House, Stoneham, Massachusetts
Bryant-Lasater House, Mulberry, Arkansas, listed on the National Register of Historic Places in Crawford County, Arkansas
Bixby-Bryant Ranch House, Yorba Linda, California, listed on the National Register of Historic Places in Orange County, California
Bryant House (Nicholasville, Kentucky), listed on the National Register of Historic Places in Jessamine County, Kentucky
Garnett Bryant House, Oakland, Kentucky, listed on the National Register of Historic Places in Warren County, Kentucky
Charles G. Bryant Double House, Bangor, Maine, listed on the National Register of Historic Places in Penobscot County, Maine
James and Anne Atmore Bryant Farmstead, Wattles Park, Michigan, listed on the National Register of Historic Places in Calhoun County, Michigan
Ballentine-Bryant House, Sardis, Mississippi, listed on the National Register of Historic Places in Panola County, Mississippi
Dr. John S. Jr. and Harriet Smart Bryant House, Independence, Missouri, listed on the National Register of Historic Places listings in Jackson County, Missouri
Edward W. and Rose Folsom Bryant House, Tekamah, Nebraska, listed on the National Register of Historic Places in Burt County, Nebraska
James Bryant House, Harris Crossroads, North Carolina, listed on the National Register of Historic Places in Moore County, North Carolina
George Bryant House, Elyria, Ohio, listed on the National Register of Historic Places in Lorain County, Ohio
Louis E. Bryant House, Oneida, Tennessee, listed on the National Register of Historic Places in Scott County, Tennessee
William Bryant, Jr., House, Cedar Hill, Texas, listed on the National Register of Historic Places in Dallas County, Texas